Joachim Bjerke (born 11 November 1994) is a Norwegian professional tennis player and coach. He reached a career-high singles ranking of world No. 912 on 19 May 2014. Bjerke has recently been known for coaching Casper Ruud. He has also taken part of the Norwegian Davis Cup Team. In 2012, Joachim won the Norwegian championship beating Stian Boretti (former 375 on the ATP ranking) in the final and has several national titles to his name. His Norwegian title in 2012 was seen as sensational since he was under 18, and knocked out several of Norway's best players on his way to the final. Among other players, such as Norwegian rival Øystein Steiro and former double partner Mons Knudtzon, Bjerke has been praised for his strong forehand and rapid footwork.

References

1994 births
Living people
Norwegian male tennis players
Sportspeople from Oslo
21st-century Norwegian people